Mathis Independent School District is a public school district based in Mathis, Texas (USA).

Located in San Patricio County, small portions of the district extend into Live Oak and Bee counties. Other communities served by the district include Lakeside, San Patricio, Lake City, Edgewater-Paisano, and Lakeshore Gardens-Hidden Acres.

In 2009, the school district was rated "academically acceptable" by the Texas Education Agency.

Schools
Mathis High School (Grades 9-12)
Mathis High School for International Studies (Grades 9-12)
Mathis Middle School (Grades 6-8)
Mathis Intermediate School (Grades 3-5)
Mathis Elementary School (Grades PK-2)

Administration
Superintendent: Maria Rodriguez-Casas, Ph.D.

Board of trustees
John Galvan, President
Alberto Lopez, Jr., Vice President
Rick Cortez, Jr., Secretary
Joe M. Leija, Member
Angie Trejo, Member
Albert Lopez, Jr., Member
Rudy S. Hernandez, Member

References

External links
 

School districts in San Patricio County, Texas
School districts in Live Oak County, Texas
School districts in Bee County, Texas